Lady Christian Norah Dawson-Damer (7 August 1890 - 29 March 1959) was the sister-in-law of Queen Elizabeth the Queen Mother.

She was the daughter of the 5th Earl of Portarlington, Lionel Dawson-Damer, and Emma Kennedy.  She married for the first time to Captain the Hon. Fergus Bowes-Lyon, son of Claude Bowes-Lyon, 14th Earl of Strathmore and Kinghorne and his wife Cecilie née Cavendish-Bentinck on 17 September 1914.

They had one child born shortly before Bowes-Lyon's death in the First World War:
 Rosemary Lusia Bowes-Lyon (18 Jul 1915 - 18 Jan 1989)

After Fergus's death she remarried to Captain William Frederick Martin, son of Charles William Wall Martin, on 4 June 1919.

They had a son born the year after they married: 
Nigel Damer Martin (1920 - 1990)

References

External links
Her portrait at the National Portrait Gallery

Daughters of Irish earls
1890 births
1959 deaths
Dawson-Damer family